In Greek mythology, Perse (Ancient Greek:) is one of the 3,000 Oceanids,  water-nymph daughters of the Titans Oceanus and Tethys. Her name was also spelled as Persa, Persea or Perseis. Perse married Helios, the god of the sun, and bore him several children, most notably the sorceress-goddess Circe.

Mythology 
Perse was one of the wives of the sun god, Helios. According to Homer and Hesiod, with Helios she had Circe and Aeëtes, with later authors also mentioning their children Pasiphaë, Perses, Aloeus, and even Calypso, who is however more commonly the daughter of Atlas. It is not clear why would Perse bear Helios, the source of all light, such dark and mysterious children.

When Aphrodite cursed Helios to fall in love with the mortal princess Leucothoe, he is said to have forgotten even about Perse. She seems to have been linked to witchcraft and knowledge of herbs and potions, much like her daughters Circe and Pasiphaë. She might have also been associated with the witchcraft goddess Hecate, who was also called Perseis (as in "daughter of Perses") and who is said to be Circe's mother in one version.

Possible connections 
Perseis' name has been linked to Περσίς (Persís), "female Persian", and πέρθω (pérthō), "destroy" or "slay" or "plunder".

Kerenyi also noted the connection between her and Hecate due to their names, denoting a chthonic aspect of the nymph, as well as that of Persephone, whose name "can be taken to be a longer, perhaps simply a more ceremonious, form of Perse", as did Fowler, who noted that the pairing made sense given Hecate's association with the Moon. It has been suggested that Hecate's "Perseis" epithet denotes lunar connections. However, as Mooney notes, there is no evidence that Perse was ever a moon goddess on her own right.

An inscription of Mycenaean Greek (written in Linear B) was found on a tablet from Pylos, dating back to 1400–1200 BC. John Chadwick reconstructed the name of a goddess, *Preswa who could be identified with Perse. Chadwick found speculative the further identification with the first element of Persephone.

Genealogy

See also 
 Medea
 Perimede
 Neaera
 List of Oceanids
 List of Mycenaean deities

Footnotes

Notes

References 

 Apollodorus, The Library with an English Translation by Sir James George Frazer, F.B.A., F.R.S. in 2 Volumes, Cambridge, MA, Harvard University Press; London, William Heinemann Ltd. 1921. ISBN 0-674-99135-4. Online version at the Perseus Digital Library. Greek text available from the same website.
 Apollonius Rhodius, Argonautica translated by Robert Cooper Seaton (1853-1915), R. C. Loeb Classical Library Volume 001. London, William Heinemann Ltd, 1912. Online version at the Topos Text Project.
 Apollonius Rhodius, Argonautica. George W. Mooney. London. Longmans, Green. 1912. Greek text available at the Perseus Digital Library.
 Bell, Robert E., Women of Classical Mythology: A Biographical Dictionary, ABC-CLIO 1991, . Internet Archive.
 Hesiod, Theogony from The Homeric Hymns and Homerica with an English Translation by Hugh G. Evelyn-White, Cambridge, MA.,Harvard University Press; London, William Heinemann Ltd. 1914. Online version at the Perseus Digital Library. Greek text available from the same website.
 Homer, The Odyssey with an English Translation by A.T. Murray, PH.D. in two volumes. Cambridge, MA., Harvard University Press; London, William Heinemann, Ltd. 1919. . Online version at the Perseus Digital Library. Greek text available from the same website.
 Diodorus Siculus, The Library of History translated by Charles Henry Oldfather. Twelve volumes. Loeb Classical Library. Cambridge, Massachusetts: Harvard University Press; London: William Heinemann, Ltd. 1989. Vol. 3. Books 4.59–8. Online version at Bill Thayer's Web Site
 Diodorus Siculus, Bibliotheca Historica. Vol 1-2. Immanel Bekker. Ludwig Dindorf. Friedrich Vogel. in aedibus B. G. Teubneri. Leipzig. 1888-1890. Greek text available at the Perseus Digital Library.
 Hyginus, Gaius Julius, The Myths of Hyginus. Edited and translated by Mary A. Grant, Lawrence: University of Kansas Press, 1960.
 Hard, Robin, The Routledge Handbook of Greek Mythology: Based on H.J. Rose's "Handbook of Greek Mythology", Psychology Press, 2004, . Google Books.
 
Marcus Tullius Cicero, Nature of the Gods from the Treatises of M.T. Cicero translated by Charles Duke Yonge (1812-1891), Bohn edition of 1878. Online version at the Topos Text Project.
 Marcus Tullius Cicero, De Natura Deorum. O. Plasberg. Leipzig. Teubner. 1917.  Latin text available at the Perseus Digital Library.
 Mooney, Carol M., Hekate: Her Role and Character in Greek Literature from before the Fifth Century B.C., a thesis submitted to the faculty of graduate studies, McMaster University, 1971.
 Ovid. Metamorphoses, Volume I: Books 1-8. Translated by Frank Justus Miller. Revised by G. P. Goold. Loeb Classical Library No. 42. Cambridge, Massachusetts: Harvard University Press, 1977, first published 1916. . Online version at Harvard University Press.
 Publius Ovidius Naso, Metamorphoses translated by Brookes More (1859-1942). Boston, Cornhill Publishing Co. 1922. Online version at the Perseus Digital Library.
 Publius Ovidius Naso, Metamorphoses. Hugo Magnus. Gotha (Germany). Friedr. Andr. Perthes. 1892. Latin text available at the Perseus Digital Library.
 Publius Ovidius Naso, Remedia Amoris in  The Love Poems: The Amores, Ars Amatoria and Remedia Amoris, with an English translation by A. S. Kline. 2001. Full text available at poetryintranslation.com.
 The Classical Review, volume IX, 1985, Library of Illinois.

External links 

 PERSE on the Theoi Project

Greek goddesses
Oceanids
Sea and river goddesses
Women of Helios
Persephone
Magic goddesses
Metamorphoses characters
Characters in the Odyssey
Epithets of Hecate